The women's scratch at the 2012 Dutch National Track Championships in Apeldoorn took place at Omnisport Apeldoorn on December 30, 2011. 16 athletes participated in the contest.

Competition format
Because of the number of entries, there were no qualification rounds for this discipline. Consequently, the event was run direct to the final. The race started at 18:00 and consisted on 40 laps, making a total of 10 km.

Results

DNF = Did not finish.
Results from nkbaanwielrennen.nl

References

2012 Dutch National track cycling championships
Dutch National Track Championships – Women's scratch